Holland's Got Talent (often referred to as HGT) is the Dutch version of the Got Talent series, which was created by Simon Cowell, who also created the series The X Factor. The first season began broadcasting in March 2008 on SBS6.

This television program looks for a new talent of all ages. The auditions of Holland's Got Talent take place on a stage in front of a large audience. The jury currently consists of Chantal Janzen, Marc-Marie Huijbregts, Edson da Graça and Dan Karaty. The first two seasons of Holland's Got Talent were presented by Gerard Joling. Robert ten Brink presented seasons 3 up to 7 and starting from season eight Johnny de Mol will be presenting the show as Robert ten Brink is too busy with his own programs, and the program was due for a refreshening. Candidates must display their "talent" for the jury and an audience. The jury assesses the performance and if the talent is good enough for the live shows. Eventually the last 40 candidates or acts will compete in the three or four live shows for the finals. To date, there have been eleven winners: Danielle Bubberman, Tessa Kersten, Martin Hurkens, Aliyah Kolf, DDF Crew, Amira Willighagen, Leon Lissitza, Nick Nicolai, The Fire, Shinshan and Tommmy & Rowan. Each winner received a different price.

SBS6 first chose the name Got Talent, but it was nevertheless changed to Holland's Got Talent later. SBS6 announced on March 16, 2010, that the station would not adopt a new season of Holland's Got Talent. The program was officially adopted in 2010 by RTL.

The original lineup of the jury panel consisted of Henkjan Smits, Patricia Paay and Robert Ronday. After the show was taken over by RTL, Smits and Ronday were forced to say goodbye to the show. They were then replaced by Idols and X Factor judge Gordon Heuckeroth and So You Think You Can Dance judge Dan Karaty. Over the years, the jury panel has changed multiple times.

Seasons

Judges and hosts

References

External links

2008 Dutch television series debuts
Netherlands
Dutch television series based on British television series
SBS6 original programming